The 2011 Individual Long Track/Grasstrack World Championship was the 41st edition of the FIM speedway Individual Long Track World Championship.

The world title was won by Joonas Kylmäkorpi of Finland for the second time.

Venues

Final Classification

References 

2011
Speedway competitions in the Czech Republic
Speedway competitions in France
Speedway competitions in Germany
Speedway competitions in the Netherlands
Speedway competitions in Norway
Speedway competitions in Finland
2011 in Dutch motorsport
2011 in German motorsport
2011 in French motorsport
2011 in Finnish sport
2011 in Norwegian sport